James Kerr (born 17 August 1940) is a fencer from the United States Virgin Islands. He competed in the individual épée event at the 1984 Summer Olympics.

References

External links
 

1940 births
Living people
United States Virgin Islands male épée fencers
Olympic fencers of the United States Virgin Islands
Fencers at the 1984 Summer Olympics